Ferrucyon is an extinct genus of omnivorous mammal of the family Canidae, which inhabited North America during the Pliocene, Blancan in the NALMA classification, from about 4.9 to approximately 2.6 Ma. The type species, F. avius, was originally interpreted as a relative of the modern crab-eating fox, and described as a species belonging to the genus Cerdocyon. Ruiz-Ramoni et al. (2020) reinterpreted it as a vulpine canid related to North American species Metalopex macconnelli, and to the Eurasian genus Nyctereutes. This reinterpretation necessitated removal of "Cerdocyon" avius from the genus Cerdocyon, and Ruiz-Ramoni et al. (2020) transferred it to the separate genus Ferrucyon.

Taxonomy 
Cerdocyon was named by Hamilton-Smith (1839). It was assigned to Canidae by Hamilton-Smith (1839) and Carroll (1988).

Fossils of the species have been found in Baja California (Refugio Formation).

References 

Vulpini
Prehistoric canines
Pleistocene carnivorans
Pleistocene species extinctions
Pleistocene mammals of North America
Blancan
Pleistocene Mexico
Fossils of Mexico
Fossil taxa described in 2020